Phycodes tortricina is a moth in the family Brachodidae. It was described by Frederic Moore in 1881. It is found in southern India.

References

Brachodidae
Moths described in 1881